Emanuel Awuley Quaye, known as Awulley Senior Quaye, is a former international Ghanaian football player. He captained the Ghana team as they won the 1978 African Cup of Nations. He is the father of Abdullah Quaye and Lawrence Quaye.

Awuley played club football as a defender for Accra Great Olympics F.C.

References

External links

Ghanaian footballers
Ghana international footballers
Living people
Association football defenders
Africa Cup of Nations-winning players
1978 African Cup of Nations players
Year of birth missing (living people)
Accra Great Olympics F.C. players